Time Tripping is an album (LP Vinyl) released by the Fullerton College Jazz Band for the Discovery Records Trend AM-PM label, it became the Down Beat Magazine 1st Place Award Winner in the College Big Band Jazz category for 1983.

Background 
In 1981 the Music Department at Fullerton College built a 16 track in house recording facility which was to serve as a teaching tool for both student music groups  and students wanting to take recording technology classes at a vocational level.  Time Tripping is the second of many albums to come out of this studio to feature the award-winning Fullerton College Jazz Band.  The LP does contain tracks from three of the Fullerton College jazz groups: Jazz Band I, Jazz Band II, Connection Jazz Combo.  The distinctive qualities about the LP that set it apart from numerous college jazz records (what people think of as promotional demos) is the fact it was a two-year community college able to get on a label so quickly and the LP received 1st place as the Down Beat Magazine best College Big Band Jazz album for 1983.  Albert Marx, who was the owner of Discovery Records/Trend Records AM-PM label, became very impressed with the band and the level of the music coming from the jazz groups at Fullerton College.   He decided to support the younger, up and coming jazz students/players from the greater Los Angeles/Southern California region by producing certain LPs.  Dave Dexter, Jr., formerly with Capitol Records and a writer for both Down Beat and Billboard Magazines, did the liner notes for the LP jacket.  "Frankly, I detected no difference in the quality of the music," Dave Dexter, Jr. says from the liner notes, when hearing the different groups' tracks.

The album beat out recordings in Down Beat from heavy-weight groups at large universities and prestigious music schools such as the Eastman School of Music's Jazz Orchestra, the University of Miami's Concert Jazz Band and North Texas State University's Grammy nominated One O'Clock Lab Band.   After this recording there became a consistent tradition of musicians coming from the Fullerton College program who have worked with major musical acts, on major studio and movie projects, and hold positions in higher education in music.   The roster on this album is self-evident as to the diversity and level of student musicians Fullerton College developed at that time and has for many years. 
In 1998 the group and one track from the album ("Battle Of The Bop Brothers") was featuring on a compilation CD released by BMG Records entitled "Taking Notes - Volume 2, Showcasing the Worlds Top Jazz Students."  This same track is also featured on the 1998 CD Celebration - The Fullerton College Jazz Festival 25th Anniversary.

Track listing

Recording Sessions 
 recorded January 26, 27, and 28, 1983, Fullerton College, Fullerton, California

Personnel

Musicians 
 Conductors: Terry Blackley and James Linahon
 Piano (guest soloist): Tom Ranier
 Sax (guest soloist): Ernie Del Fante
 Trumpet (guest soloist): James Linahon
 Saxes and woodwinds: Steve Villa, Steve Alaniz, Jack Cooper, Phil Walker,
 Harold Manning, Brian Bez, Tony Morris, Edmund Velasco, Laura Nixon, Ed Valizan
 Trumpets and flugelhorns: Charlie Peterson, Phillip Wightman, Kye Palmer, Randy Ames, Mike Anthony, Robert Villegas, Phil Peterson, Mark New, Brett Pallet
 Trombones: Tim Hoff, Mark McLaren, Rich Berkeley, Clint Anna, Scott Eilers, Roger Olsen, Wendell Kelly, Pat McCarty, Bob Heller, Dale Sanders
 Guitar: Randy Penland, Rusty Anderson
 Piano: Mark Stephens, Barbara Farkas
 Bass: Tim Givens, Denise Briese
 Drums: Dave Hitchings, Pat Ready

Production 
 Recording engineers: Alex Cima and James Linahon
 Second recording engineer: Randy Beers
 Mixing engineers: Alex Cima, Terry Blackley, Roger Myers, and James Linahon.
 Mastering: Dave Ellsworth
 Photography: Tom Leonard and James Aul
 Cover photo: Peggy Rahman
 Liner notes: Dave Dexter, Jr.
 Album title: Karen Ray-Blackley
 Album design: Lenora Hennessy, KM Records
 Album coordination: Karen Stone, KM Records
 Album supervision: Debra Robins

Reception 
Down Beat Magazine 1st Place Award Winner in the College Big Band Jazz category

References

External links

 Official website

1984 albums
Fullerton College Jazz Band albums